Circle of Death may refer to:

Arts and entertainment
Circle of Death (album), by Dance Club Massacre, 2008
The Circle of Death, a 1922 German silent film directed by William Karfiol
The Circle of Death, a 1935 American film directed by Yakima Canutt

Sports and recreation
Circle of death (boating), a hazardous phenomenon experienced by motorboats
Circle of Death (cycling), the hardest Tour de France stage in the Pyrenees
Circle of Death (drinking game) or Kings, a drinking game using playing cards
Circle of Death (sports), a type of tie in sporting events

See also
Red Ring of Death, an indicator of some types of Xbox 360 technical problems